Marcel Beraud was a French skier. He competed in the Nordic combined event at the 1928 Winter Olympics.

References

External links
 

Year of birth missing
Year of death missing
French male Nordic combined skiers
Olympic Nordic combined skiers of France
Nordic combined skiers at the 1928 Winter Olympics
Place of birth missing